The 2009 Canadian Figure Skating Championships took place between January 14 and 18, 2009 at the Credit Union Centre in Saskatoon, Saskatchewan. The event determines the national champions of Canada and was organized by Skate Canada, the nation's figure skating governing body. Skaters competed at the senior and junior levels in the disciplines of men's singles, women's singles, pair skating, and ice dancing. Although the official International Skating Union terminology for female skaters in the singles category is ladies, Skate Canada uses women officially. The results of this competition were used to pick the Canadian teams to the 2009 World Championships, the 2009 Four Continents Championships, and the 2009 World Junior Championships, as well as the Canadian national team.

The junior compulsory dance was the Starlight Waltz and the senior compulsory dance was the Viennese Waltz.

Senior results

Men

Women

Pairs
Reigning champions Anabelle Langlois / Cody Hay withdrew before the event due to injury to Langlois.

Ice dancing

Junior results

Men

Women

Pairs

Ice dancing

International team selections
The international teams were announced as follows:

World Championships

Four Continents Championships

World Junior Championships

References

External links
 Official site
 2009 Canadian Figure Skating Championships

Canadian Figure Skating Championships
Figure skating
Canadian Figure Skating Championships
Sports competitions in Saskatoon
2009 in Saskatchewan